Win Every Argument: The Art of Debating, Persuading, and Public Speaking is a 2023 non-fiction book by Mehdi Hasan.

Publication 
Win Every Argument is 336-page non-fiction book written by MSNBC journalist Mehdi Hasan, and published in 2023 by Henry Holt and Company.

Synopsis 
The book presents readers with a sixteen-step process to win arguments, and includes advice on tactics including understanding the audience and use of facts, humour, and emotion. It encourages debaters to both prepare well and listen carefully. It includes quotes and stories from Hasan's professional experience.

Critical reception 
Win Every Argument was described by Noelia Martinez, writing in Library Journal, as a "great resource" for people in academic and corporate environments.

Win Every Argument first appeared on the The New York Times Best Seller list at #7 for the category of Advice, How-To & Miscellaneous for the week of March 19, 2023.

References 

2023 non-fiction books
Henry Holt and Company books